Roast beef is a dish of beef that is roasted, generally served as the main dish of a meal. In the Anglosphere, roast beef is one of the meats often served at Sunday lunch or dinner. Yorkshire pudding is a standard side dish. Sliced roast beef is also sold as a cold cut, and used as a sandwich filling. Leftover roast beef may be minced and made into hash.

Roast beef is a characteristic national dish of England and holds cultural meaning for the English dating back to the 1731 ballad "The Roast Beef of Old England". The dish is so synonymous with England and its cooking methods from the 18th century that a French nickname for the English is "les Rosbifs".

History

Despite the song, roast beef was not generally eaten in medieval England: "no medieval feast featured ... roast beef, even in England".

Culinary arts
The beef on weck sandwich is a tradition in western New York dating back to the early 1800s. Roast beef is sometimes served with horseradish or horseradish sauce. In Denmark, it is mostly used in open sandwiches, called smørrebrød.

Roast beef sandwich

The roast beef sandwich commonly comprises bread, cold roast beef, lettuce, tomatoes, and mustard, although finding cheese, horseradish, fresh/powdered chili pepper, and red onion would not be uncommon.

Gallery

References

External links

American cuisine
Canadian cuisine
British cuisine
English beef dishes
Irish cuisine
Danish cuisine
Australian cuisine
New Zealand cuisine
South African cuisine
Christmas food
Beef
National dishes
American meat dishes
British beef dishes
Irish meat dishes